Oborzyska can refer to:

Nowe Oborzyska
Stare Oborzyska